SYML is the solo venture of Brian Fennell, who was previously part of the indie band Barcelona. SYML released his eponymous debut album on May 3, 2019, through Nettwerk Records.

Life and career 
Brian Fennell was born on January 16, 1983, in Issaquah, Washington, to his adopted parents. From a young age, he began studying classical piano, often playing in his grandmother's retirement home. He began writing his own music when he was 18 years old, his first song being used as a coping mechanism after the death of a schoolmate. After high school, he attended Seattle Pacific University and graduated with a Degree in Music Education with an emphasis in percussion. After years of living in and around Seattle, he returned to his hometown and resides there where he writes and produces out of a home studio.

Fennell performs under the solo project SYML, Welsh for "simple" and pronounced "sim-muhl", inspired by his own personal heritage from his biological parents, who are Welsh. His experience grappling with his adoption and heritage are influences in his songwriting.

He shared his self-titled debut in 2019 with the now Platinum-certified single "Where's My Love" and the wordless EP You Knew It Was Me in November 2020. In 2021, SYML released his third body of work, titled DIM inspired by his late father's cancer diagnosis. Fennell believes the word 'dim' perfectly describes mourning, a theme he continues to visit throughout his work. 

After his song "Where's My Love" was used on the drama TV show Teen Wolf, the song charted for 20 weeks on the Billboard Hot Rock Songs chart. In 2018, the song received Gold certification in Canada and Belgium, and held the #1 spot on Canada's CBC Top 20 charts twice. SYML's "Wildfire" appeared in the Belgian teen drama web series wtFOCK, an adaption of the Norwegian series SKAM. "Where's My Love" was featured prominently in the trailer for the 2018 film Adrift. SYML's singles "Where's My Love", "Fear of Water" and "Body" were featured in the American supernatural drama television series Shadowhunters. In 2020, "Where's My Love" appeared in the movie Chemical Hearts.

It was announced on December 7, 2022 that SYML collaborated on the forthcoming Lana Del Rey album Did You Know That There's a Tunnel Under Ocean Blvd.

On February 3, 2023, SYML released a new album titled The Day My Father Died, which consists of 15 tracks.

Discography

Studio albums

Live albums

EPs

Singles

References 

1983 births
Living people
Whitworth University alumni
American indie rock musicians
People from Issaquah, Washington
Musicians from Washington (state)